
Year 430 BC was a year of the pre-Julian Roman calendar. At the time, it was known as the Year of the Consulship of Crassus and Iullus (or, less frequently, year 324 Ab urbe condita). The denomination 430 BC for this year has been used since the early medieval period, when the Anno Domini calendar era became the prevalent method in Europe for naming years.

Events 
 By place 
 Greece 
 The army of Sparta loots Attica for a second time, but Pericles is not daunted and refuses to revise his initial strategy. Unwilling to engage the Spartan army in battle, he again leads a naval expedition to plunder the coasts of the Peloponnesus, this time taking 100 Athenian ships with him.
 Potidaea finally capitulates to the siege by Athenian forces in the winter.
 An outbreak of a plague hits Athens and the disease ravages the densely packed city (modern DNA analyses of material from ancient cemeteries suggest the mortal disease may have been typhus). The plague wipes out over 30,000 citizens, sailors, and soldiers as well as Pericles' two sons. Roughly one-quarter of the Athenian population dies. The fear of plague is so widespread that the Spartan invasion of Attica is abandoned, their troops being unwilling to risk contact with the diseased enemy.
 Pericles becomes ill from the plague but he recovers, temporarily. He is deposed from his position as General (or Strategos) but is later reappointed.

 By topic 
 Art 
 Polyclitus completes one of his greatest statues, the Diadumenos (Diadem-bearer).
 Approximate date – Sophocles' drama Oedipus Rex is first performed in Athens.

 Religion 
 Traditional date where scholars believe the Hebrew prophet known as Malachi writes the 39th and last book, and last of the prophetic books, of the Old Testament of the Biblical canon, the Book of Malachi, a prophetical book and was the thirty-ninth and final addition to the Old Testament. Biblical books written between now and the millennium will not be included in the Hebrew Bible and in some Christian traditions considered Biblical apocrypha.

Births

Deaths 
 Empedocles, Greek philosopher (approximate date) (b. c. 490 BC)
 Phidias, Greek sculptor (approximate date) (b. c. 480 BC)
 Zeno of Elea, Greek philosopher (approximate date) (b. c. 490 BC)

References